Reichenbach is a German surname. Notable people with the surname include:

Bernhard Reichenbach (1888-1975), German Communist
Carl Reichenbach (1788-1869), chemist and metaphysician, studied mesmerism and somnambulism
Ernst Stromer von Reichenbach (1871-1952), German paleontologist
Georg Friedrich von Reichenbach (1771-1826), astronomical instrument maker
Harry Reichenbach (1882-1931), us press agent and publists - promoted Disney's Steamboat Willie
Hans Reichenbach (1891–1953), philosopher and linguist
Heinrich Gottlieb Ludwig Reichenbach (1793–1879), German botanist and ornithologist
Heinrich Gustav Reichenbach (1823-1889), German botanist
Ted Ryko (Edward Reichenbach) (1892-1968), Australian Cyclist and Photographer
Sébastien Reichenbach (born 1989), Swiss cyclist

See also
Emma Pieczynska-Reichenbach (1854–1927), Swiss feminist and abolitionist

References

German-language surnames